Family court is any court that deals with family law.

Family court may also refer to:

Law 
 Family Court of Australia
 Family Court of Western Australia
 Family Court (Hong Kong)
 Hawaii State Family Courts
 Family Court (Ireland)
 Family Court (England and Wales)
 Family Courts Act 1980 of New Zealand
 New York Family Court
 Philadelphia Family Court
 Family Court Building located in Philadelphia and formerly housed the Philadelphia Family Court

Television 
 The Family Court (TV series)
 Family Court with Judge Penny, a syndicated TV program

See also
Family law